Events from the year 1664 in China. Also known as 癸卯年 (Water Rabbit) 4360 or 4300 to 甲辰年 (Wood Dragon) 4361 or 4301.

Incumbents 
 Kangxi Emperor (3rd year)
 Regents — Sonin, Ebilun, Suksaha, and Oboi

Viceroys
 Viceroy of Zhili — Miao Cheng
 Viceroy of Min-Zhe — Zhao Tingchen
 Viceroy of Huguang — Zhang Changgeng
 Viceroy of Shaanxi — Bai Rumei
 Viceroy of Guangdong — Li Qifeng
 Viceroy of Yun-Gui — Zhao Tingchen 
 Viceroy of Guizhou — Tong Yannian, Yang Maoxun
 Viceroy of Yunnan — Bian Sanyuan
 Viceroy of Sichuan — Li Guoying
 Viceroy of Jiangnan —  Lang Tingzuo

Events 
 January — Dutch fleets return to Batavia after Qing-Dutch alliance fails
 Spring — Zheng Jing withdraws the last Zheng family forces on the mainland from Tongshan, Fujian
 After failing talk the Zheng family into peacefully surrendering, Dutch Captain Herman de Bitter defeats a fleet at Penghu in August and temporarily occupies Keelung harbor
 A planned Qing invasion of the Kingdom of Tungning led by Admiral Shi Lang and supported by the Dutch fleet in Taiwan fails to occur
 Ming loyalist Zheng Huangyan is executed in Hangzhou
 An imperial edict imposes another ban on footbinding
 Changsha becomes the capital of Hunan province, having been upgraded from a superior prefecture
 The British East India Company begins trade in China
 Jesuit missionary and astronomer Adam Schall von Bell is tried due to accusations by Yang Guangxian
 Sino-Russian border conflicts

Births 
 France — François Xavier d'Entrecolles (1664 – 1741); Chinese name: 殷弘绪, Yin Hongxu) a French Jesuit priest, who learned the Chinese technique of manufacturing porcelain through his investigations in China at Jingdezhen

References

 

 
China